Athena Coustenis is an astrophysicist specializing in planetology. Dr. Coustenis, a French national, is director of research, Centre national de la recherche scientifique (CNRS] French National Center for Scientific Research), at LESIA (Laboratoire d'études spatiales et d'instrumentation en astrophysique), at the Paris Observatory, Meudon. She is involved in several space mission projects for the European Space Agency (ESA) and for NASA. Her focus is on gas giant planets Saturn, Jupiter and their moons, and she is considered a foremost expert on Saturn's moon Titan.

Early life and education 

Born in Athens, Kingdom of Greece, in 1961, Athena Coustenis moved to Paris, France, where she received a master's degree in astrophysics and space techniques at the Pierre and Marie Curie University (UPMC), Paris 6, in 1986 and a master's degree in English literature, at the University of Paris III: Sorbonne Nouvelle, in 1987. Coustenis defended her PhD thesis in astrophysics and space techniques, "Titan's atmosphere from Voyager's infrared observations", at the Pierre and Marie Curie University (UPMC), Paris 7, in 1989, where in 1996 she went on to obtain a Habilitation to Direct Research (HDR).

Career 

Coustenis worked as senior researcher at DESPA, then at LESIA from 1991 to 2008. From 2008 to the present, Athena Coustenis is director of research with CNRS, at LESIA at the Paris Observatory, in Meudon, France. She is involved in several high-level committees of scientific societies, associations and institutions.

Coustenis is currently the chair of ESA's Human Spaceflight and Exploration Science Advisory Committee (HESAC); Chair of the COSPAR Panel on Planetary Protection; Chair of the Comité d'Evaluation sur la Recherche et l'Exploration Spatiales of the Centre National d’Etudes Spatiales. She is also or has been involved in several leadership committees of scientific societies, associations and institutions including the European Geosciences Union (EGU), International Union of Geodesy and Geophysics (IUGG), International Astronomical Union (IAU), International Academy of Astronautics (IAA), European Planetary Science Congress (EPSC), Europlanet, International Space Science Institute (ISSI), and the International Society for the Study of the Origin of Life (ISSOL).

Coustenis was in particular formerly the president of the IUGG International Association of Meteorology and Atmospheric Sciences (IAMAS: 2011-2015) and of the ESA Solar System and Exploration Working Group (2010-2014). She has served as the Chair of the European Science Foundation European Space Science Committee (ESF-ESSC) from 2014 until 2020, as President of the EGU Division for Planetary Sciences and as Vice-Chair of the EUROPLANET Society.

Research 

Coustenis uses ground and space-based observatories to study Solar System bodies with emphasis on the satellites of the giant planets Saturn and Jupiter and exoplanets. She focuses on the astrobiological aspects and the search for habitable worlds in the Solar System and beyond. Her research in comparative planetology use the study of climate changes to further the understanding of long-term evolution on our own planet. She was co-investigator of three of the instruments aboard the Cassini/Huygens mission CIRS, HASI, DISR. In recent years she has been leading efforts to define and select future space missions to be undertaken by the European Space Agency and its international partners. She is science Co-Investigator in future missions like JUICE to the Jovian System and ARIEL for exoplanetary spectroscopic studies.

Publications 

Coustenis, A., Encrenaz, Th., 2013. Life beyond Earth: the search for habitable worlds in the Universe. Cambridge Univ. Press. .

Coustenis, A., Taylor, F., 2008. Titan: Exploring an Earth-like World. World Scientific Publishing, Singapore, Eds. .

Coustenis, A., Taylor, F., 1999. Titan, the Earth-like moon. World Scientific Publishing, Singapore, Eds. .

Coustenis has published or co-authored over 300 scientific papers, articles and encyclopedia chapters.

Memberships, honours and awards 

 The NASA Group Achievement Award for the Cassini Programme Huygens Atmospheric Structure Instrument (HASI)
 The NASA Group Achievement Award for the Cassini Program Descent Imager Radiometer Spectrometer (DISR)
 The NASA Public Service Group Achievement Award for the Huygens Atmospheric Structure Instrument (HASI)
 The NASA Public Service Group Achievement Award for the Descent Imager Spectrometer radiometer (DISR)
 The ESA Award for making an outstanding contribution to the Huygens Probe.
 The American Astronomical Society awarded Coustenis in 2014 with the Harold Masursky award.
 Member of the Bureau des Longitudes
 In 2017 elected member, International Academy of Astronautics.
 Since January 2018, Associated member of the Royal Academy of Belgium.
 18101 Coustenis (2000 LF32) is a main-belt asteroid discovered on 5 June 2000 by the Lowell Observatory Near Earth Object Search at the Anderson Mesa Station. It was named after Dr Athena Coustenis, of Paris-Meudon Observatory, France, following a suggestion by Prof. M. Fulchignoni.
 French order of merit : Legion of Honour (Chevalier de la Légion d’honneur)

References 

1961 births
20th-century Greek astronomers
20th-century French astronomers
20th-century French women scientists
20th-century French physicists
21st-century French astronomers
21st-century French women scientists
21st-century French physicists
Living people
Chevaliers of the Légion d'honneur
Greek women scientists
21st-century Greek astronomers
Greek astrophysicists
Women planetary scientists
Planetary scientists
French National Centre for Scientific Research scientists
French astrophysicists
Women astrophysicists
Scientists from Athens
Greek emigrants to France